South Westmeath was a constituency in Ireland, returning one Member of Parliament to the United Kingdom House of Commons from 1885 to 1918.

Prior to the 1885 general election and after the dissolution of Parliament in 1918 the area was part of the Westmeath constituency.

Boundaries
This constituency comprised the southern part of County Westmeath.

1885–1918: The baronies of Brawny, Clonlonan, Kilkenny West, Moycashel and Rathconrath, that part of the barony of Fartullagh not contained within the constituency of North Westmeath, that part of the barony of Moyashel and Magheradernon contained within the parish of Dysart (exclusing the townlands of Ballyote, Slanebeg and Slanemore), and that part of the barony of Moyguish contained within the parish of Kilmacnevan.

Members of Parliament

Elections

Elections in the 1880s

Elections in the 1890s

Elections in the 1900s

Sullivan's death causes a by-election.

Elections in the 1910s

References

Westminster constituencies in County Westmeath (historic)
Constituencies of the Parliament of the United Kingdom established in 1885
Constituencies of the Parliament of the United Kingdom disestablished in 1918